Thomas Clerk was an English  priest, most notably the first recorded Dean of Chester, serving less than six months in 1541

Notes

1732 deaths
16th-century English people
Deans of Chester